"Good Good Night" (explicitly known as "Good Fucking Night") is a song by American hip hop recording artist Roscoe Dash. The song, which was released on October 4, 2011, serves as the lead single for his debut extended play (EP) J.U.I.C.E.. The track was produced by Kane Beatz.

Music video
A music video for the record was released on Dash's Vevo and YouTube accounts on September 29, 2011. It was directed by G Visuals. J. Holiday made a cameo appearance.

Charts

Release history

References

2011 singles
Roscoe Dash songs
Song recordings produced by Kane Beatz
Songs written by Kane Beatz
2011 songs
Songs written by Leon Sylvers III
Songs written by Roscoe Dash